Michael Crawley may refer to:

Mick Crawley (born 1949), British ecologist
Mike Crawley, Canadian businessman and politician
Mike Crawley, Canadian television journalist for CBC Toronto

See also
Michael Crowley (disambiguation)